Javier Godino (born March 11, 1978 in Madrid) is a Spanish actor.

Biography 

Godino began his studies at Juan Carlos Corazza's School of Interpretation. He is a Spanish actor, having worked in both Spanish and international cinematic productions, as well as musicals, theater and television.

In 2009, he played an important role for his career, playing Isidoro Gomez in Argentine director Juan José Campanella's film The Secret in Their Eyes, winner of the Academy Award for Best Foreign Language Film, where he shared the lead with Ricardo Darín and Soledad Villamil.

On stage, he was one of the protagonists in Nacho Cano's Hoy No Me Puedo Levantar, which opened in Madrid in April 2005, and went on to become Spain’s longest running and highest selling musical. Godino's portrayal of the character of Colate received rave reviews.

For his role in the musical he was nominated by his peers for the Union de Actores de España award. For The Secret in Their Eyes he received a nomination to the 2010 Argentine Academy of Cinematography Arts and Sciences Awards. He has also worked alongside Hugh Jackman and Ewan McGregor in the Hollywood production Deception.

Godino has also made a name for himself as a singer. Working on Nacho Cano's projects he has recorded many songs. For the soundtrack of Hoy No Me Puedo Levantar he recorded the songs Perdido en mi habitación, Hoy no me puedo levantar, Barco a Venus and No es serio este cementerio. His voice also featured in Mecano medley which was used in Coca-Cola Light's television ad. In Nacho Cano's second musical A, Godino was also the lead and he went on to record three songs: Sin alma yo no hablo, El segundo grupo and Tu deber es volver. With Antonio Carmona he recorded El tango de los amantes with Argentine singer Graciela Giordano, Les feuilles mortes and Nostalgias. He created alongside Asier Acebo, his first music band "The Wyest".

In 2011 was released José Luis García Sánchez's movie Los muertos no se tocan, nene, based on a novel by Rafael Azcona. In May 2012, the Spanish-Argentine co-production Everyone Has a Plan starring Viggo Mortensen, Daniel Fanego, Sofía Gala and Soledad Villamil was released worldwide. The film was shot in the Paraná Delta near Buenos Aires.

He played the leading character in 2012 Los Dias no vividos by Lacaña Brothers and in 2014 telefilm Prim, el asesinato de la calle del Turco by Miguel Bardem playing the famous writer Benito Pérez Galdós.

He had a short supporting role on the Netflix TV show Borgia as Dionigi Di Naldo during 2nd and 3rd season, and also worked in Spanish TV.

He starred Pasaje de vida by Diego Corsini, filmed in Argentina and Spain with great reviews of his performance.

In 2016 will be released The Chosen, a Mexican-Spanish co-production by Antonio Chavarrías and Al final del túnel, an Argentine-Spanish produced film by Rodrigo Grande.

Filmography 
 2016 -   The Chosen -Dir. Antonio Chavarrías
 2016 -  Al final del Túnel -Dir. Rodrigo Grande
 2015 -  Pasaje de Vida -Dir. Diego Corsini
 2012 -  "Los días no vividos" -Dir. Alfonso Cortés-Cavanillas
 2012 - Everybody Has a Plan - Dir. Ana Piterbarg
 2011 - Los muertos no se tocan, nene - Dir. Jose Luis Garcia Sanchez
 2011 - La voz dormida - Dir. Benito Zambrano
 2010 - Nominated for Newcomer Award for The Secret in Their Eyes, Spanish Actors Guild
 2009 - Nominated for Best New Actor for The Secret in Their Eyes, Argentine Academy of Cinematography Arts and Sciences Awards
 2009 - The Secret in Their Eyes - Dir. Juan José Campanella
 2008 - Deception - Dir. Marcel Langeneger
 2007 - Café solo o con ellas - Dir. Álvaro Díaz Lorenzo
 2000 - Besos para todos - Dir. Jaime Chávarri

External links 
 
 Javier Godino on Myspace
 Javier Godino on Kuranda
 Interview with Javier Godino in the magazine Fotogramas 
 The Secret in Their Eyes review from The New Yorker
 The Secret in Their Eyes review from NPR

1978 births
Living people
Male actors from Madrid
Spanish male film actors
Spanish male musical theatre actors